The Anglo-Russian Convention of 1907, or Convention between the United Kingdom and Russia relating to Persia, Afghanistan, and Tibet, was signed on August 31, 1907, in Saint Petersburg. It ended the longstanding rivalry in Central Asia and enabled the two countries to outflank the Germans, who were threatening to connect Berlin to Baghdad with a new railroad that could potentially align the Ottoman Empire with Imperial Germany.

The Convention ended the long dispute over Persia. Great Britain promised to stay out of northern Persia, and Russia recognized southern Persia as part of the British sphere of influence. Russia also promised to stay out of Tibet and Afghanistan. In exchange, London extended loans and some political support. The convention brought shaky British–Russian relations to the forefront by solidifying boundaries that identified respective control in Persia, Afghanistan and Tibet. It delineated spheres of influence in Persia, stipulated that neither country would interfere in Tibet's internal affairs, and recognized Britain's influence over Afghanistan. The agreement led to the formation of the Triple Entente.

Background 

During the last third of the nineteenth century, the Russian Empire's advances into Central Asia and the consolidation of Great Britain's domination of South Asia led to intense rivalry between the two European powers. The conflicting interests centered on Afghanistan, Iran, and Tibet, three states that constituted buffers between the two powers. The emergence of the German Empire as a world power and the defeat in 1905 of Russia by a nascent Asian power, the Empire of Japan, in the Russo-Japanese War, helped to persuade some British and Russian officials of a need to resolve their respective differences in Asia. There was talk of an entente during the 1880s and 1890s, especially after Britain's occupation of Egypt in 1882. However, there was stiff resistance in Britain to a deal with Russia. In the leadup to the convention, there were discussions on the Straits question. Foreign Minister Sir  Edward Grey thought entente with Russia a good idea. On 20 October 1905, during the election, he said:
...if Russia accepts, cordially and whole-heartedly, our intention to preserve the peaceable possession of our Asiatic possessions, then I am quite sure that in this country no government will make it its business to thwart or obstruct Russia's policy in Europe. On the contrary, it is urgently desirable that Russia's position and influence be re-established in the councils of Europe.
and later, writing to his ambassador to Russia Sir Arthur Nicolson:
It is not for us to propose changes with regard to the treaty conditions of the Dardanelles. I  think some change in the direction desired by Russia would be admissible and we should be prepared to discuss the question if Russia introduces it.
In early 1907, Alexander Izvolsky, the Russian ambassador at Paris, raised the question and talks were carried on in London with Russian Ambassador Count Alexander Benckendorff. Little is known but the "suggestion appears to have been made that Russia should have free egress from the Black Sea through the Straits, while other powers should have the right to send their vessels of war into the Straits without going into the Black Sea" together with some talk of "Russia's occupying the Bosphorus and England the Dardanelles, after which the Straits might be opened to other warships as well." In the event nothing came of the discussions at the time.

Rise of Germany 

On May 20, 1882, Germany entered into the Triple Alliance with Italy and Austria-Hungary, complementing its industrial and socio-political ascendance in the world arena. Furthermore, Germany dramatically increased its military output from the early 1900s up to the outbreak of the First World War. Under the unified German state, Otto von Bismarck worked to increase the nation's global influence and reach what was then the zenith of German power. While Britain and Russia were hostile to German designs in the region, members of the Triple Alliance were in turn opposed to Anglo-Russian influence in Asia. Thus, military and territorial expansion was Germany's key to making itself a major player in the international arena of power. Germany's interest in the Middle East took a secondary position, one subordinate to Germany's primary policy toward Europe, throughout the late 19th and early 20th centuries. While of secondary importance, it was a tool that was used to manipulate the Middle Eastern attempt to play off the Western powers against each other. Berlin peacefully made inroads into the Ottoman Empire and had few colonial aspirations in the region.

Trouble in Persia 

In 1905, revolutionary activity spread throughout Tehran, forcing the shah to accept a constitution, allow the formation of a majles (parliamentary assembly), and hold elections. Major figures in the revolution had secular goals, which then created rifts in the clergy to the advantage of the monarchy. Neither the British nor the Russian governments approved of the new political arrangement, which was both liberal and unstable, and preferred a stable puppet government, which allowed foreign concessions and supported their designs in the region.

To facilitate their goals in Persia, the British and the Russian governments discussed splitting it into three zones. The agreement stipulated that it would "allocate the north, including Isfahan, to Russia; the south-east, especially Kerman, Sistan, and Baluchistan to Britain; and demarcate the remaining land between the two powers as a neutral zone". The division of Persia would reinforce the control of Britain and Russia over their respective territorial and economic interests in the country as well as allowed for continued interference in Persia's political system. With foreign help, the revolutionaries became outflanked by a combination of European and monarchist activities. The Persian government quickly came to realise that an Anglo-Russian alliance posed a larger threat to Iranian sovereignty than the two powers being hostile. Consequently, in 1907, Britain and Russia signed an agreement to regulate their economic and political interests.

Terms

The agreement recognized the country's sovereignty but also divided it into three separate zones. The agreement designated all of northern Iran, which bordered Russia's possessions in Transcaucasia and Central Asia, as an exclusive sphere of influence for Russian interests. The northern zone was defined as beginning at Qasr-e Shirin in the west, on the border with the Ottoman Empire, and running through Tehran, Isfahan and Yazd to the eastern border, where the frontiers of Afghanistan, Iran, and Russia intersected. A smaller zone in southeastern Iran, which bordered British India, was recognized as an exclusive sphere for Britain. The British zone extended west as far as Kerman in the south central and Bandar Abbas in the south. The area separating these two spheres, including part of central Iran and the entire southwest, was designated a neutral zone in which both countries and their respective private citizens could compete for influence and commercial privileges.

For Britain and Russia, the agreement was important in establishing a diplomatic alignment that endured until the First World War. The Persian government, however, had not been consulted about the agreement but was informed after it had been signed. Although not in a position to prevent Britain and Russia from implementing the agreement, the Persian government refused to recognize the accord's legitimacy since it threatened the country's national integrity. Iranian nationalists, in particular, were infuriated by Britain's signing of the treaty, a country that they had considered as a beacon of democracy during the Constitutional Revolution. Subsequently, an important legacy of the agreement was the growth of anti-British sentiments and other anti-Western attitudes as strong components of Iranian nationalism. The agreement did not eliminate all competition between the two powers with respect to their policies in Iran, but after 1907, broad co-operation was fostered, particularly when Anglo-Russian interests were threatened. In particular, Britain and Russia intervened in Iran's domestic politics, supporting the royalists in their struggle with the constitutionalists. The agreement lapsed in 1918, after it was renounced by the new revolutionary Soviet Russia.

See also
 Dogger Bank incident
 Entente Cordiale
 Franco-Russian Alliance
 The Great Game
 Persian Campaign

References

Further reading
 "The Recent Anglo-Russian Convention" The American Journal of International Law (1907) pp 979–984 online
 Abrahamiam, Ervand, A History of Modern Iran (Cambridge University Press, 2008)
 Adelson, Roger, London and the Invention of the Middle East: Money, Power, and War, 1902–1922 (St. Edmundsbury Press, 1995)
 Churchill, Platt Rogers. The Anglo-Russian Convention of 1907 (1939). 
 Habberton, William. Anglo-Russian Relations Concerning Afghanistan, 1837–1907 (U. of Illinois, 1937).
 
 
 Mahajan, Sneh. British foreign policy 1874–1914: The role of India (Routledge, 2003).
 Palmer, A. W. "The Anglo-Russian Entente" History Today (Nov 1957) 7#11 pp 748–754.
 Sicker, Martin. The Bear and the Lion: Soviet Imperialism and Iran (Praeger Publishers, 1988).
 Siegel, Jennifer, Endgame: Britain, Russia and the Final Struggle for Central Asia (New York: I.B. Tauris, 2002)
 Soroka, Marina. Britain, Russia and the Road to the First World War: The Fateful Embassy of Count Aleksandr Benckendorff (1903–16) (Routledge, 2016).
 Tomaszewski, Fiona K. A Great Russia: Russia and the Triple Entente (Greenwood Publishing Group, 2002)
 Williams, Beryl J.  "The Strategic Background to the Anglo-Russian Entente of August 1907." Historical Journal 9#3 (1966): 360–73. online.

External links
Brigham Young University library website. The Anglo-Russian Entente

1907 in the United Kingdom
1907 in the Russian Empire
20th-century military alliances
Russia–United Kingdom military relations
Treaties concluded in 1907
Military alliances involving the United Kingdom
Military alliances involving Russia
Treaties of the Russian Empire
Treaties of the United Kingdom (1801–1922)
Bilateral treaties of the United Kingdom
Bilateral treaties of Russia
1907 in Iran
Iran–Russia relations
Iran–United Kingdom relations